Oliver! is the soundtrack to the 1968 British musical drama film of the same name. The soundtrack won an Oscar for Best Original or Adaptation Score at the 41st Academy Awards in 1969. It reached number 4 in the UK Albums Chart and spent 99 weeks on the chart.

Track listing

Personnel 
Adapted from AllMusic.
Ensemble – primary artist
John Green – arranger, conductor, music supervisor
Mark Lester – guest artist, performer, primary artist
Kathe Green - dubbing for Mark Lester
Joe Lopes – engineer
Ron Moody – guest artist, performer, primary artist
The Orchestra – performer, primary artist
Oliver Reed – guest artist, performer
Harry Secombe – performer, primary artist
John Snyder – mixing, producer
Shani Wallis – guest artist, performer, primary artist
Don Wardell – digital series, executive producer
Sheila White – performer, primary artist
Jack Wild – performer, primary artist

Charts

References 

1968 soundtrack albums
Musical film soundtracks
Colgems Records soundtracks
Scores that won the Best Original Score Academy Award